Forbes Airport  is a small airport located  west northwest of Forbes, New South Wales, Australia.

See also
List of airports in New South Wales

References

Airports in New South Wales